Saphenista rhabducha is a species of moth of the family Tortricidae. It is found in Pastaza Province, Ecuador.

The wingspan is about 14.5 mm. The ground colour of the forewings is cream tinged, suffused and strigulated (finely streaked) with pale brownish ochreous with some browner marginal strigulae. The hindwings are brownish white basally, but pale brownish on the periphery.

Etymology
The species name refers to the very large cornutus and is derived from Greek rhabduchos (meaning carrying a perch).

References

Moths described in 2007
Saphenista